Lubitz is a German language habitational surname. Notable people with the name include:
 Andreas Lubitz (1987–2015), German pilot
 Otto Ernst Lubitz (1896–1943), German screenwriter, film producer and production manager
 Wolfgang Lubitz (born 1949), German chemist and biophysicist

References 

German-language surnames
German toponymic surnames
Germanized Slavic family names